Colonel Albert Jennings Fountain (October 23, 1838 – disappeared February 1, 1896) was an American attorney who served in the Texas Senate and the New Mexico House of Representatives. Following a purge of corruption among cattle rustlers that Fountain investigated and prosecuted, he and his eight-year-old son Henry disappeared near White Sands, New Mexico Territory. Their bloodstained wagon and other evidence of an ambush were recovered, but the bodies were never found. Suspicion centered on two rival landowners, Oliver M. Lee and Albert Bacon Fall. Lee and two employees were tried for the murder of Henry Fountain, but acquitted after a defense by Fall. No charges were ever filed for the death of Albert Fountain.

Biography
Albert Fountain was born on Staten Island, New York, on October 23, 1838, to Solomon Jennings and his wife Catherine de la Fontaine. He went to California as a young man and began calling himself by an Anglicised version of his mother's family name. (Accounts differ as to why he did so.) Fountain studied law in California and was admitted to the bar in 1860. Working as a reporter for The Sacramento Union, he travelled to Nicaragua in 1860 to cover the filibustering expedition of William Walker. Angering Walker by his reports, Fountain was arrested and sentenced to be shot. However, he escaped and returned to California.

In August 1861, during the American Civil War, Fountain enlisted in the Company E of the 1st California Infantry Regiment of the Union Army and was elected first sergeant of his company. He took part in the 1862 recapture of the New Mexico Territory as a member of the California Column. In October 1862, he married Mariana Pérez of Mesilla. They would become the parents of four sons and two daughters. Later commissioned a second lieutenant, he was discharged on August 31, 1864. Fountain almost immediately joined the New Mexico volunteers because of the ongoing Indian Wars. In June 1865, he was seriously wounded while pursuing hostile Apaches. He spent a night trapped under his dead horse, with a bullet in his thigh, an arrow in his forearm, and another arrow in his shoulder. On his recovery, Fountain was discharged as a brevet captain.

Fountain settled in El Paso, Texas, working for the United States Property Commission, which investigated and disposed of former Confederate property. He was then made the customs collector for the El Paso region. Fountain was next appointed an election judge, and finally became the assessor and collector of internal revenue for the Western District of Texas. In 1870, Fountain became a co-founder of the Church of St. Clement, the first Protestant church in El Paso. 

In November 1869, Fountain won a seat as a Republican in the Texas Senate, serving in the Twelfth and Thirteenth Texas Legislatures. He was elected as president pro tempore during the second session of the Twelfth Legislature and served as Lieutenant Governor ex officio at the same time, as the office was vacant. Fountain's most notable accomplishment was pushing through the bill that re-established the Texas Rangers, which had been abolished after the Civil War. Fountain's Radical Republican views angered Texas Democrats and he was challenged to several duels, resulting in him killing at least one man, Frank Williams.

In 1873, Fountain moved from El Paso to Mesilla with his wife and their five children. There he became a lawyer, using his fluent Spanish to good advantage in jury trials. Fountain was appointed assistant district attorney and also served as probate judge and a deputy court clerk. In 1877, he founded a newspaper, the Mesilla Valley Independent, which was issued in both English and Spanish. He also founded the Mesilla Dramatic Society and the Mesilla Valley Opera House, now The Fountain Theater, both originally operated by his family.

As a lawyer in Mesilla, Fountain's most famous client was Billy the Kid. Fountain lost the 1881 case, and Billy the Kid was convicted of murder despite the evidence, though he escaped from jail. In 1888, Fountain was elected to the New Mexico Territorial Legislature, defeating his enemy Albert Bacon Fall. At the time of Fountain's disappearance, he was investigating and prosecuting suspected cattle rustlers, specifically Oliver M. Lee, and he again found himself at odds with Fall, who was Lee's attorney.

Disappearance and probable murder
On February 1, 1896, Fountain and his eight-year-old son Henry disappeared near White Sands on the way to their home in Mesilla. They were returning from Lincoln, where Fountain had been assisting the prosecution in bringing charges against Lee and William McNew. All that was found at the site of the disappearance were Fountain's buckboard wagon, several empty cartridge cases, his cravat and papers, and two pools of blood. The only sign of Henry was a blood-soaked handkerchief with two powder-blackened coins, the handkerchief still carefully knotted in one corner. Missing were the victims' bodies, a blanket, a quilt, and Fountain's Winchester rifle.

Some speculated that outlaw Tom "Black Jack" Ketchum and his gang were involved. Most, however, were convinced the disappearances could be attributed to Lee, a noted rancher, land developer, and a part-time Deputy U.S. Marshal. Lee's employees McNew and Jim Gililland were also suspected of involvement. Lee and Gililland were pursued by lawman Pat Garrett and a posse, who engaged them in a gunfight near Alamogordo. However, after Deputy Sheriff Kent Kearney was mortally wounded July 12, 1898, Garrett and his posse withdrew. Lee and Gililland would later negotiate their surrender to others. They were defended by Fall, who years later would become the first United States presidential cabinet member convicted of a felony and sentenced to prison during the Teapot Dome Scandal. The accused were acquitted due to a lack of evidence.

Fountain was a powerful rival to land owners Fall and Lee. Fall was also known to hate Fountain as a political rival, just as Fountain hated Fall. Fall's association with Lee began when he had defended Lee in a criminal case. Fountain had repeatedly challenged Fall and his men in the courts and the political arena.

As the bodies of Fountain and his son were never found, the prosecution was greatly hampered. No one was ever charged with the murder of Albert Fountain. Lee and his employees, McNew and Gililland, were tried for the murder of Henry Fountain. Charges also were never filed for the death of Deputy Sheriff Kearney. The charges against McNew were dismissed, while Lee and Gililland were both acquitted.

Memorials to both Albert Jennings Fountain and his son are in the Masonic Cemetery in Las Cruces, though their actual burial site remains a mystery.

The Fountain family in Las Cruces
Fountain was a Freemason, and held membership at Aztec Lodge No.3 in Las Cruces where he served as Worshipful Master of the lodge several times.  On February 8, 1896, one week after his and his son Henry's disappearance, Aztec Lodge drafted a charter offering a total reward of $700 (in 1896) for returning the bodies of Fountain and Henry to the lodge, and for the arrest and conviction of the parties concerned in the abduction and supposed murder of Fountain and his son.  The reward offered by the charter is still valid to this day.

The Fountain family ran the Mesilla Valley Opera House and built the Fountain Theatre in Old Mesilla near Las Cruces. The theater was rebuilt in 1905 for stage plays and musical concerts, and is the oldest motion picture theater in New Mexico. It is currently operated by the Mesilla Valley Film Society. The interior decoration includes murals of Albert Fountain painted by his son, Albert, Jr.

In popular media

Fountain's disappearance was dramatized in the 2013 film Among the Dust of Thieves.

A fictionalized version of the events surrounding Fountain's disappearance is depicted in the novel Hard Country by Michael McGarrity.

Fountain's disappearance and death are discussed by John Grady Cole and Mac in the 1998 novel “Cities of the Plain” by Cormac McCarthy, the third and final volume in the “Border Trilogy”.

See also

List of people who disappeared
San Elizario Salt War
Texas Senate
Thirteenth Texas Legislature
Thomas B. Catron
Twelfth Texas Legislature

Notes

References
 Gibson, A. M., The Life and Death of Colonel Albert Jennings Fountain, (Norman: University of Oklahoma Press, 1965)
 Owen, Gordon, The Two Alberts: Fountain and Fall, (Las Cruces: Yucca Tree Press, 1996)
 Recko, Corey, Murder on the White Sands: The Disappearance of Albert and Henry Fountain, (Denton: University of North Texas Press, 2007)
 Sonnichsen, C. L., Tularosa: The Last of the Frontier West, (Albuquerque: University of New Mexico Press, 1960)
 1880–1910 United States Federal Census
 Gardner, Mark Lee: To Hell on a Fast Horse: Billy the Kid, Pat Garrett and the Epic Chase to Justice in the Old West. New York: William Morrow, 2009.

External links

Borderlands
"The Fountain Murders: Sites Today"

American judges
American prosecutors
Union Army soldiers
1838 births
1896 deaths
American newspaper reporters and correspondents
People of the American Old West
Members of the New Mexico Territorial Legislature
Missing person cases in New Mexico
Politicians from El Paso, Texas
Politicians from Staten Island
People of California in the American Civil War
People of the New Mexico Territory
Politicians from Las Cruces, New Mexico
Presidents pro tempore of the Texas Senate
New Mexico Republicans
Republican Party Texas state senators
19th-century American journalists
American male journalists
1890s missing person cases
19th-century American male writers
19th-century American politicians
Journalists from New York City
Journalists from Texas
19th-century American judges